Massimo Santoro Tubito or   (December 1660 - ...) was an Italian priest and writer. He's best known for his books Divinum Theatrum (1702) and De Antichristo (1712), both of them written in Latin. The subjects covered are history and religion.

Altiliensis refers to the legends about the founding of the city of Altamura, whose ancient name is believed to have been Altilia.

The toponym Altilia lacks historical evidence, and most scholars - such as Ottavio Serena - tend to reject it. According to other historians, such as Tommaso Berloco (1985), there isn't enough evidence either to dismiss the toponym or to prove it.

Life 
Massimo Santoro Tubito was born in Altamura on December 1660. His father was Angelo Tubito, while his mother was Angela Perillo. His brother was Michele Tubito, an apostolic protonotary. Both the death date and the death place are unknown.

He was member of the so-called Accademia degli Spensierati.

In media 
 Cesare Orlandi (1734-1779) cites Santoro Tubito in the first volume of his work.
 Massimo Santoro Tubito and his book De Antichristo are cited in Carlo Animato's book Roma kaputt mundi (2012).

See also 
 Antichrist
 Altamura

References

Works

Bibliography

External links 
 De Antichristo

17th-century Italian Roman Catholic priests
Italian male writers
Antichrist
1660 births
People from Altamura